The Anti-Urinal Bill (or Proposition 411), is legislation that was passed by the Wheelock city council in Wheelock, Texas in March 1952. The legislation called for many restrictions regarding the restrooms of any public buildings built within Wheelock city limits.

History
In a meeting in early May 1952, council member Gene Hill proposed a piece of legislation which essentially put restrictions on the specifications of restrooms in all public buildings. His request (labeled Proposition 411) passed with a council vote of 4–1 and was put into effect a week later.

The legislation stated that:
 Fresh soap must be present in every bathroom
 Only non-wooden stall doors could be used
 Modern plumbing must be installed in all establishments
Proposition 411 also:
 Prevented the building of 'co-ed' bathrooms (family bathrooms)
 Contained constraints regarding the size of men's and women's bathrooms

But the most famous and talked about aspect of Proposition 411 was that it also banned the use of urinals or 'tank-less' toilets from public bathrooms. Called the 'anti-urinal' bill by locals, the bill was the first of its kind in the whole state of Texas to impose local limitations to public restrooms. It was mentioned briefly by the nearby Bryan Eagle  and Robertson County Gazette as well as in the inaugural edition of Mad magazine.

According to local historian Jennette Rivers, the townspeople were wary of the relatively new technology for several reasons. One of the reasons was that there were many falsified accounts of urinal related injury spreading throughout the town. The townspeople were wary of this new technology and its potential harmful impact and were susceptible to believing rumors regarding health risks involved with urinal use. Another worry to the community was the lack of privacy associated with urinals. Urinals were more exposed than the traditional stalls or outhouses and this was considered immodest by the elders of what was a heavily Protestant community.

Proposition 411 was still enacted as of February 2011.

See also
 Wheelock, Texas

References

External links 
State of Texas Website

Texas law
Urinals